Glenn Newton Wilkes (November 28, 1928 – November 21, 2020) was an American college basketball coach and athletics administrator. He served as the head men's basketball coach at Stetson University in DeLand, Florida from 1957 to 1993 and was the school's athletic director from 1968 to 1990. Known as the Godfather of Florida basketball, Wilkes was inducted into the National Collegiate Basketball Hall of Fame in 2014.

Wilkes attended Mercer University, where he played college basketball from 1946 to 1950. At Stetson, he had over 550 wins along with 27 winning seasons. 

Wilkes wrote a book called Basketball. His son, Glenn Wilkes Jr., is the head women's basketball coach at Rollins College in Winter Park, Florida. His grandson, Wyatt, plays college basketball at Florida State University.

Head coaching record

College

References

1928 births
2020 deaths
Basketball coaches from Georgia (U.S. state)
Basketball players from Georgia (U.S. state)
Brewton–Parker Barons men's basketball coaches
Centers (basketball)
College men's basketball head coaches in the United States
Junior college men's basketball coaches in the United States
Mercer Bears men's basketball players
People from Eatonton, Georgia
Stetson Hatters athletic directors
Stetson Hatters men's basketball coaches
Syracuse Nationals draft picks
Sportspeople from the Atlanta metropolitan area